Beni Suef is the capital city of the Beni Suef Governorate in Egypt. Beni Suef is the location of Beni Suef University. An important agricultural trade centre on the west bank of the Nile River, the city is located 110 km (70 miles) south of Cairo.

Etymology 
The modern name of the town is a corruption of its original name Manfiswayh, which itself comes from a Coptic toponymic construction ⲡ-ⲙⲁ-ⲛ-... ("the place of..."); however, its exact etymology is unknown.

History 

From the early Pharaonic era to the Roman period, the area was home to the city of Heracleopolis, 10 miles west of the modern city. which also served as the capital of Lower and Middle Egypt during the 9th and 10th dynasties. The modern city rose to prominence during the Middle Ages, when it was renowned for its linen manufacturing, which continues to the present day through the city's carpet making and cotton spinning industries. Beni Suef became the chief town of the second province of Upper Egypt during the reign of Muhammad Ali in the 19th Century.

Geography 

The total area of the governorate is 1,954 square kilometers, and it is divided into six governorates. It is bordered to the north by Giza governorate and Helwan, to the northeast by Suez, to the east by the Red Sea governorate, to the west by Fayoum governorate, and to the south by Minya governorate. This region connects the north of Egypt to the south, and the east to the west, and this identity of centrality has formed the population, civilization, and economic characters of the region. The geographical proximity to vital governorates such as Cairo and Giza is significant, and the governorates of the Red Sea, Suez, Fayoum and Ismailia tourist areas all act as markets for the industrial products made in Beni Suef.

Climate 

Beni Suef has a hot desert climate (BWh) in Köppen-Geiger classification, as does all of Egypt. It has very hot summers and warm winters with cool nights.

Accidents 

A train accident in 1995 near Beni Suef left 75 people dead.
The Beni Suef Cultural Palace Fire, on September 5, 2005, killed 46 people.

Notable people 

 Berlenti Abdul Hamid, actress

Sports 

 Telephonat Beni Suef football team was promoted for the first time to the Egyptian Premier League for the 2011/2012 season.

Gallery

See also 

 Sannur Cave national park
 Bishop Athanasius
 List of cities and towns in Egypt

References

External links 

 Falling Rain Genomics, Inc. - Beni Suef, Egypt

 
Populated places in Beni Suef Governorate
Governorate capitals in Egypt
Cities in Egypt